Filorexant (developmental code name MK-6096) is an orexin antagonist which was under development by Merck for the treatment of insomnia, depression, diabetic neuropathy, and migraine. It is a dual antagonist of the orexin OX1 and OX2 receptors. It has a relatively short elimination half-life of 3 to 6hours. However, it dissociates slowly from the orexin receptors and may thereby have a longer duration. Possibly in relation to this, filorexant shows next-day somnolence similarly to suvorexant. In phase 2 clinical trials, filorexant was found to be effective in the treatment of insomnia, but was not effective in the treatment of major depressive disorder, painful diabetic neuropathy, or migraine. , filorexant was no longer listed on Merck's online development pipeline and hence development of the drug appears to have been discontinued. Development of filorexant may have been discontinued due to lack of differentiation from suvorexant (which was also developed by Merck).

See also
 List of investigational sleep drugs

References

External links
 Filorexant - AdisInsight

Abandoned drugs
Orexin antagonists
Piperidines
Pyridines
Pyrimidines
Sedatives
Organofluorides